Living in a Fantasy is the eighth album by the English singer-songwriter Leo Sayer. It was released on 22 August 1980.

Although the album was not a huge commercial success, the single that it spawned, a cover version of Bobby Vee's "More Than I Can Say", spent five weeks at No. 2 on the Billboard Hot 100 chart in December 1980 and January 1981. Sayer's version of the song was certified a gold record by the RIAA. It also spent three weeks at No. 1 on the Billboard adult contemporary chart. In the UK, the song peaked at No. 2 on the UK Singles Chart, while it spent two weeks atop the Kent Music Report in Australia. Sayer has stated that while looking for an "oldie" to record for Living in a Fantasy, he saw a TV commercial for a greatest hits compilation album by Vee, and chose the song on the spot: "We went into a record store that afternoon, bought the record and had the song recorded that night."

Track listing

Side one
"Time Ran Out on You" (Alan Tarney) – 3:50
"Where Did We Go Wrong" (Leo Sayer, Tarney) – 3:55
"You Win, I Lose" (Sayer, Tarney) – 3:43
"More Than I Can Say" (Jerry Allison, Sonny Curtis) – 3:41
"Millionaire" (Sayer, Tarney) – 4:22

Side two
"Once in a While" (Tarney) – 3:30
"Living in a Fantasy" (Sayer, Tarney) – 4:25
"She's Not Coming Back" (Sayer, Tarney) – 3:50
"Let Me Know" (Tarney) – 3:55
"Only Foolin'" (Sayer, Tarney) – 3:40

Personnel
Leo Sayer – guitar, harmonica, vocals
Nick Glennie-Smith – keyboard
Trevor Spencer – drums
Alan Tarney – bass guitar, guitar, keyboards, vocals

Production
Record producer: Alan Tarney
Mixing: Ashley Howe, Assistant: David Kemp
Mastering: John Dent
Art direction: Peter Wagg

Charts

References

External links
 

1980 albums
Albums with cover art by Hipgnosis
Chrysalis Records albums
Leo Sayer albums
Warner Records albums
Albums produced by Alan Tarney